In the Key of Disney is the ninth studio album by Brian Wilson, released on October 25, 2011, by Walt Disney Records as part of the Disney Pearl Series. The album is the second release by Disney for Wilson, after Brian Wilson Reimagines Gershwin.  Disney calls it "the album that marries the vision of two men who shaped the image of modern California – Brian Wilson & Walt Disney."

Background 

In the summer of 2009, Walt Disney Records approached Wilson about recording his own arrangements of songs from Disney films, which Wilson agreed to do after recording an album of Gershwin covers.

In The Key of Disney was recorded in early 2011.  After recording the album Wilson indicated that "The Beach Boys sound and the Disney people make a fantastic collaboration. I tried to do justice to all their songs."

Amazon.com initially offered two bonus tracks; one appeared on the compact disc version of the album, and the other appeared on the MP3 version.

Track listing

Personnel
Brian Wilson – Lead Vocals, Vocal Arrangements, Band Arrangements, Producer
Jeffrey Foskett – Vocals, 12-String Guitar, Electric Guitar, Acoustic Guitar, Toy instruments
Darian Sahanaja – Vocals, Moog Synthesizer, Marimba, Organ, Vibraphone, Harpsichord, 8-bit Bicycle Horn, Celeste, Toy instruments
Scott Bennett – Vocals, Drums, Marimba, Piano, B3 Organ, Vibraphone, Synthesizer, Toy instruments
Probyn Gregory – Vocals, Slide guitar, Trumpet, Banjo, Organ, Vibraphone, Electric Guitar, Nylon String Guitar, Acoustic Guitar, Electric 12-String Guitar, Guitar solo (on track 8), Ukulele, Tannerin, Toy instruments
Nick Walusko – Vocals, Electric Guitar, Toy instruments
Paul Von Mertens – Saxophone, Clarinet, Wooden flute, Flute, Baritone Saxophone, Alto flute, Piccolo, Bass harmonica, Band Arrangements
Mike D'Amico – Drums
Brett Simons – Bass, Acoustic Bass
Nelson Bragg – Percussion
Gary Griffin – B3 Organ, Piano, Accordion
Chris Bleth – Oboe (on tracks 6 and 11)
Leslie Stevens – Musical saw (on track 10)

References

Brian Wilson albums
2011 albums
Walt Disney Records albums
Albums produced by Brian Wilson
Covers albums